Mae Montaño Valencia (born April 7, 1953, Esmeraldas) is an Ecuadorian politician. She has worked for human and women's rights and youth rehabilitation.

Political career
Montaño became the director of A New Option in 2006, for whom she won a seat in the Constituent Assembly in 2007. Later, she helped organize the National Democratic Coalition.

Montaño is one of the founders of the Creating Opportunities (CREO) party, organized in 2010. On March 2, 2018, Montaño, dissatisfied with CREO, left the party and became an independent.

Odebrecht scandal

On June 18, 2018, under Article 131 of the Ecuadorian constitution, Montaño presented a request to the National Assembly for the impeachment of Attorney General Diego García for his role in the Odebrecht scandal, backed by 37 signatures, 23 annexes, and 1467 pieces of evidence. García had already resigned from the Attorney Generalship on January 31, 2018, after a decade at the post, but the Legislative Administration Council, the governing body of the National Assembly, approved the request on September 18, 2018, passing it to the Supervisory Commission the next day.

Citations

Living people
1953 births
People from Esmeraldas, Ecuador
Members of the National Congress (Ecuador)
Women members of the National Assembly (Ecuador)
Women government ministers of Ecuador
21st-century Ecuadorian women politicians
21st-century Ecuadorian politicians